Zachary James Rhyner (born June 21, 1986) is a medically retired Combat Controller (CCT) in the United States Air Force who received the Air Force Cross for his actions in the Battle of Shok Valley on 6 April 2008 in Nuristan Province, Afghanistan. He was the first living, and second ever, Combat Controller to receive the Air Force Cross after TSgt John A. Chapman was posthumously awarded the medal in 2002 for his actions during the Battle of Takur Ghar. He has deployed six times, including Iraq and Afghanistan. He has assisted in humanitarian operations and was a part of Operation Unified Response in Haiti during the aftermath of the 2010 Haiti earthquake.

Military career

Rhyner enlisted in the U.S. Air Force on 31 May 2004. He completed Basic Military Training as an Honor Graduate at Lackland AFB, Texas, in August 2004. A1C Rhyner then went through the Combat Control training "pipeline" which lasted from August 2004 until 2007. The Combat Control training pipeline consisted of the Combat Control Orientation Course at Lackland AFB, the Combat Control Operator course at Keesler AFB, Mississippi, then U.S. Army Airborne School at Fort Benning, Georgia. Afterwards he travelled to Fairchild AFB, Washington, for the U.S. Air Force Basic Survival School. Next he went to the Combat Control School at Pope AFB, North Carolina, where he would be later stationed. He next attended Special Tactics Advanced Skills Training at Hurlburt Field, Florida, for upwards of a year. While in AST Rhyner also attended the Army Military Freefall Parachutist School at Yuma Proving Grounds, Arizona, and lastly the U.S. Air Force Combat Diver school in Panama City, Florida. After completing the Combat Control training pipeline he was assigned to the 21st Special Tactics Squadron at Pope AFB (later Pope Field).

In addition to his Air Force Cross, Rhyner has received the Bronze Star Medal, three Purple Hearts, and the Air Force Combat Action Medal. The first Purple Heart he received was for his actions in the Battle of Shok Valley, while the second Purple Heart was from a deployment to southern Afghanistan in 2009. He received his third purple heart in March 2013, when a gunshot wound shattered his right femur and severed his sciatic nerve. Rhyner medically retired in 2015 as a result of wounds sustained in combat that prevented mobility below the knee.

Battle of Shok Valley

On 6 April 2008, a 130-man combined assault force, dubbed Commando Wrath, performed a day-time rotary-wing insertion down into a remote valley of the Nuristan Province, Afghanistan. Commando Wrath was composed of three Special Forces teams with each team having a Combat Controller attached, and a company from the 201st Afghan Commando Battalion. Rhyner, just six months out of training and on his first deployment, was attached to the C2-element (command and control) of Army Special Forces Operational Detachment Alpha 3336, from the 3rd Special Forces Group. Their mission was to capture Haji Ghafour, a high-ranking commander of the Hezb-e-Islami Gulbuddin (HIG) militant group. Shortly after landing the assault force was ambushed and pinned down and the assault force was split in two on either side of a river.

Rhyner and several Special Forces members were wounded throughout the course of the battle. Rhyner was shot twice in the chest and once in the leg, although his protective vest stopped the two bullets to his chest from causing a mortal injury. Despite being wounded within the first fifteen minutes of the battle, Rhyner continued to direct close air support and airstrikes until the assault force was evacuated seven hours later. 50 of the airstrikes he called in were within 200m of friendly positions; the term "danger close" is applied when referring to airstrikes within 600m. He was credited with saving the entire 100-man team from being overrun twice. According to the Air Force Cross citation, during the battle Rhyner directed close air support and airstrikes totalling 4,570 cannon rounds, nine Hellfire missiles, 162 rockets, a dozen 500-pound bombs, and one 2,000-pound bomb. As a result of the same battle, ten U.S. Army soldiers, nine Special Forces and one Combat Cameraman received the Silver Star, the greatest number of Silver Stars awarded for a single battle since the Vietnam War.

Capt. Stewart Parker, the Command and Control Special Forces commander at Bagram Air Base during the battle, said of Rhyner: "Rhyner is out of training less than a year and is in one of the most difficult situations ... it is an absolute testament to his character and the training these guys take. It tells me we are doing something right." During a Fox News interview with Glenn Beck, Beck asked Rhyner, "there are only—what is it?—192 people who have ever received the Air Force Cross. ... How do you put that together in your head? I mean, you are in a very elite group." Rhyner simply replied with "Any other combat controller put in the same situation would have performed in the same, exact way. ... Credit that to the training we receive and the process that we go through to become a combat controller." Future Air Force Cross recipient, and fellow Combat Controller, Robert Gutierrez was also present at the Battle of Shok Valley with Rhyner, albeit with a different Special Forces team, and regarding Rhyner's actions he said reportedly, "If it wasn't for Zach, I wouldn't be here."

Awards and honors

Air Force Cross
The Air Force Cross was presented to him by Secretary of the Air Force Michael B. Donley. Prior to presenting the award Donley stated to Rhyner "Your actions are now and forever woven into the rich fabric of service, integrity and excellence that has connected generations of America's Airmen since the very inception of airpower, Rarely do we present an Airman with the Air Force Cross, let alone a Purple Heart, and with good reason. The Air Force Cross is reserved for those who demonstrate unparalleled valor in the face of insurmountable odds." Afterwards, Chief of Staff of the United States Air Force General Norton Schwartz presented Rhyner with his Purple Heart. The last time an Air Force Cross was bestowed upon a living recipient was when Timothy Wilkinson was awarded it for his heroic actions during the 1993 Battle of Mogadishu.

Citation

Commendations
MSgt Rhyner's awards include the following:

Other honors
In 2008 he was presented the Jewish Institute for National Security Affairs' Grateful Nation Award by the Chairman of the Joint Chiefs of Staff, Navy Admiral Mike Mullen, for his actions during the Battle of Shok Valley. In 2009 Rhyner won a United Service Organizations of Metropolitan Washington Special Salute award as the 2008 USO Airman of the Year for his heroic efforts in Afghanistan the year prior. The award was presented to him by Air Force General Norton Schwartz.

References

External links

1986 births
Living people
People from Medford, Wisconsin
United States Air Force airmen
United States Air Force personnel of the War in Afghanistan (2001–2021)
Military personnel from Wisconsin
Recipients of the Air Force Cross (United States)